Eucosma brachysticta is a species of moth of the family Tortricidae. It is found in China (Tianjin, Jiangsu, Sichuan, Ningxia) and Japan.

References

Moths described in 1935
Eucosmini